Adultification bias is a form of racial prejudice where children of minority groups, typically Black children, are treated by adults as being more mature than they actually are. Actions committed by these children that would be deemed normal for child development are more likely to be treated as opportunities for discipline and children are more likely to be seen as having malicious intentions. A clear example of this bias in action is when a Black child is assumed to be older than their actual age. These perceptions could in turn perpetuate the maturity of Black children and the assumptions of adults.

Since it is a relatively new concept, adultification bias has not been well studied. Still, many studies have found that Black children are more susceptible to discipline from authority figures, such as police officers and educators. Scholars from the Georgetown Law Center on Poverty and Law have argued that adultification bias can trace its roots to slavery and Stereotypes of African Americans. Adultification bias can affect the language used when describing children or adolescences of minority groups in the media. This bias may perpetuate the school-to-prison pipeline.

Educators and authority figures can address adultification bias by improving their cultural competence and communication.

History 
Adultification is originally a psychology term describing children who act more mature than their peers as a result of being handed adult responsibilities from a young age. A 2017 study on Black girls by Georgetown Center on Gender Justice & Opportunity includes one of the first studies of "adultification bias," showing that adults perceive Black girls as more adult-like than their white peers. That study followed a 2014 study by Philip Goff on Black boys, showing that Black boys are viewed as older and more culpable for crimes than white boys of the same age.

Black children have had prior experience being treated like adults during slavery. Treatment of enslaved children varied throughout the United States. Some plantations would not assign jobs to children until they became adolescents. Others put Black children to work as early as 2 to 3-years-old. Slave owners would then decide when enslaved children made the transition from doing light chores to working hard-labor jobs assigned to adults. Typically, this transition occurred by the time they were eight to nine.

Other historical factors have contributed to the adultification of Black youth, such as the invention of adolescence as a construct. Adolescence as a construct was invented because during these years, a person has more independence while the brain is still developing impulse control and emotional regulation. Adolescence is a period of time that was invented by the White middle class to allow children the flexibility to test boundaries and develop identities. The aging of Black youth prevents them from having the same privileges as White youth.

Relationship to other stereotypes 
Stereotypes of the angry black man and the angry black woman affect how the behaviors of Black children are perceived and may be part of the reason why adultification bias is so prevalent with Black children. Adultification bias may be upheld and perpetuated by stereotypes of African Americans, such as the jezebel, sapphire, and mammy stereotypes. Since these stereotypes represent the opposite standards of femininity and respect, Black girls and women are seen as unfeminine and thus disrespectful, mature, loud, and hypersexual. The idea that Black children are not children may impact the hypersexualization of Black girls. As early as the age of 5, Black girls are seen as more mature and knowledgeable on adult-appropriate topics, like sex.

Standards of femininity were developed around white women and girls, and are typically associated with being docile, quiet, modest and ready to follow requests from authority. These standards are applied to young Black girls to a higher degree than other girls. Whenever these girls speak out, they may indirectly reinforce the stereotype of Black girls as disrespectful and unfeminine. Many of these girls find it easier to conform to the expectations of them, such as stopping their use of African-American Vernacular English, as to not be marginalized in the classroom.

Comments from studies have described Black girls "act like animals" and they "have to be tamed." These comments coincide with the historical comparison of Black people to animals, which may worsen adultification bias towards Black children when they misbehave in front of authority figures. A study found that Black children are highly associated with African primates, especially young Black boys.

Black boys tend to be stereotyped as criminals and hypermasculine and described as aggressive, rough, or unkind. Black boys perceived as mature early on because of stereotypes might actually fuel their misbehavior in schools and perpetuate their adultification.

Consequences

Education 
Black students may face hypercriticism from authority figures, especially while in school. Teachers can perceive Black girls as being loud or sassy compared to white girls and punish them over being "unladylike." Teachers are less likely to help Black students when they need help in school since they are assumed to be delinquents and incapable of success. Because of their perceived maturity, Black children are seen as less in need of access to mentorship and leadership opportunities. Black children are treated to "know better" by teachers and are not seen as having one of the main characteristics of childhood: innocence. Black students may also be penalized more over mistakes on schoolwork.

Black girls are more likely to be disciplined in school than white girls for subjective infractions including, but not limited to dress code violations, fighting, loitering, and harassment. They are more susceptible to verbal and physical violence by authority figures in schools. The United States Department of Education found that Black girls are six times more likely to be suspended than white girls. Not only are Black girls found to have high rate of discipline in school over white girls, they tend to have higher rates than boys belonging of other racial/ethnic groups, further highlighting this bias in Black students.

Some schools, however, do have Black and other minority boys consistently being disciplined over other groups of children. Black boys are three times more likely than other students to be suspended from school. Overall, black boys have the highest suspension and drop out rates from both elementary and high school. According to the National Center for Education Statistics, the largest group with out-of-school suspensions from public schools is black boys, accounting for 17.6 percent of suspensions from 2013-2014. From that same study, they found that Black girls account for the second largest percentage of out-of-school suspensions at 9.6 percent.

During the 1980s and 1990s, more schools started to rely on policies like drug-sniffing dogs and armed police officers in response to student misbehavior. Some say that these policies may actually exacerbate anti-Blackness through school policies such as these because they create environments in which Black girls learn their feelings do not matter and that they will not receive the benefit of the doubt over misbehavior. Some of the students can tell when these teachers treat Black students differently from white students and are left isolated from students and teachers because of this treatment. When Black children speak up over the bias, they are seen as "talking back" or being too assertive rather than expressing their concerns and usually receive some type of disciplinary action. Witnessing the harsh discipline of these students in schools can desensitize others to situations when Black students are given worse punishments.

Justice System 
Between 1985 and 1997, the amount of Black girls in the juvenile justice system was growing at a rate higher than any other population. Black girls are 2.7 times more likely to be referred to juvenile justice over white girls, and young Black girls are 1.2 times more likely to be detained by the police.

Adultification bias may contribute to the school-to-prison pipeline by having Black children punished in schools and increasing their chances of being placed in prison or wrongfully imprisoned. Students that have been suspended are three times more likely to drop out of school and those who drop out are three times more likely to be incarcerated. Black youth are three times more likely than White youth to be put in residential placement. A study showed that participants viewed Black juveniles as more similar to adults than to White juveniles when blamed for a crime. This can impact teens being detained as being treated like adults, despite the precedent that shows that juveniles are less culpable than adult offenders.

Healthcare 
Adultification bias can impact the health care a child might receive. Studies have shown that health care providers provide less services to Black patients, including giving them less time, information, and attention. Black children are impacted by this lack of services, as many of them receive longer wait times and less analgesia than white children. Black teens are often tested for sexually transmitted diseases when presenting with abdominal symptoms despite reporting no sexual activity.

See also 

 Free Grace case
 School-to-prison pipeline
 Angry black woman
 Jezebel
 Strong black woman
 Criminal stereotype of African americans
 Stereotypes of African americans

References

External links
 Research Confirms that Black Girls Feel the Sting of Adultification Bias Identified in Earlier Georgetown Law Study, Georgetown University Law Center

Anti-black racism